Dechene may refer to:

Aimé-Miville Déchêne (1881-1944), Canadian lawyer and politician
Alphonse-Arthur Miville Déchêne (1848-1902), Canadian politician
François-Gilbert Miville Dechêne (1859-1902), Canadian lawyer and politician
Joseph Miville Dechene (1879-1962), Canadian politician
Julie Miville-Dechêne (born 1959), Canadian senator
Lucien Dechene (born 1925), Canadian hockey player
Dechene, Edmonton, Alberta, Canada